, is a side scrolling arcade game, released by Namco in 1988 exclusively in Japan. Mirai Ninja was adapted into the Japanese live-action film of the same name, which was also produced by Namco. The game runs on Namco System 2 hardware, and is the first Namco game to be adapted into a film.

Character designs and directing of the film were done by Keita Amemiya of Zeiram and Kamen Rider fame. Both the game and the movie were released in the same year. Although the arcade game was only released in Japan, the movie was released direct-to-video overseas by Mondo Pop, under the two titles of Cyber Ninja in the United States, and Warlord in Canada.

In both the film and the arcade game a man's body and soul are stolen and used as part of a demon's castle. What's left becomes a cyber-ninja named Shiranui.  The player controls Mirai Ninja, who must fight various enemies and bosses by rapidly throwing shurikens at them (and slashing them with his sword at close range). His life meter uses Kanji for the numbers; this was previously done in Namco's earlier Japan-only title, Genpei Tōma Den (1986), for the score display. The penultimate stage, "Castle Kurosagi", also only has one way out of it.

Reception 
In Japan, Game Machine listed Mirai Ninja on their January 1, 1989 issue as being the tenth most-successful table arcade unit of the month.

References 

1988 video games
Arcade video games
Arcade-only video games
Japan-exclusive video games
Namco beat 'em ups
Namco arcade games
Nintendo Switch games
PlayStation 4 games
Video games about ninja
Video games set in castles
Science fiction video games
Side-scrolling beat 'em ups
Video games developed in Japan
Video games adapted into films
Hamster Corporation games
Ninja characters in video games